Elections to the French National Assembly were held in Chad and Ubangi-Shari on 10 November 1946. The territories elected three seats to the Assembly via two electoral colleges; the first college spanned both territories and elected one member, whilst each territory elected one member via the second college. René Malbrant was elected from the first college, with Gabriel Lisette elected from the second college in Chad and Barthélémy Boganda elected in the second college in Ubangi-Shari.

Results

First college

Second college

Chad

Ubangi-Shari

References

Chad
1946 11
1946 in Ubangi-Shari
Chad
1946 11
1946 in Chad
November 1946 events in Africa